Villanova is a genus of Latin American plants in the sunflower family.

Species
 Villanova achilleoides (Less.) Less. - Mexico (Morelos, Puebla)
 Villanova oppositifolia Lag. - Bolivia, Chile (Antofagasta)
 Villanova robusta Phil. - Chile (Tarapacá)
 Villanova titicacensis (Meyen & Walp.) Walp. - Bolivia, Ecuador

References

Perityleae
Asteraceae genera
Taxa named by Mariano Lagasca